Cabell Calloway III (December 25, 1907 – November 18, 1994) was an American singer, songwriter, bandleader, conductor and dancer. He was associated with the Cotton Club in Harlem, where he was a regular performer and became a popular vocalist of the swing era. His niche of mixing jazz and vaudeville won him acclaim during a career that spanned over 65 years.

Calloway was a master of energetic scat singing and led one of the most popular dance bands in the United States from the early 1930s to the late 1940s. His band included trumpeters Dizzy Gillespie, Jonah Jones, and Adolphus "Doc" Cheatham, saxophonists Ben Webster and Leon "Chu" Berry, guitarist Danny Barker, bassist Milt Hinton, and drummer Cozy Cole.

Calloway had several hit records in the 1930s and 1940s, becoming known as the "Hi-de-ho" man of jazz for his most famous song, "Minnie the Moocher", originally recorded in 1931. He reached the Billboard charts in five consecutive decades (1930s–1970s). Calloway also made several stage, film, and television appearances until his death in 1994 at the age of 86. He had roles in Stormy Weather (1943), Porgy and Bess (1953), The Cincinnati Kid (1965), and Hello Dolly! (1967). His career saw renewed interest when he appeared in the 1980 film The Blues Brothers.

Calloway was the first African-American musician to sell a million records from a single and to have a nationally syndicated radio show. In 1993, Calloway received the National Medal of Arts from the United States Congress. He posthumously received the Grammy Lifetime Achievement Award in 2008. His song "Minnie the Moocher" was inducted into the Grammy Hall of Fame in 1999, and added to the Library of Congress' National Recording Registry in 2019. Three years later in 2022, the National Film Registry selected his home films for preservation as "culturally, historically or aesthetically significant films". He is also inducted into the Big Band and Jazz Hall of Fame and the International Jazz Hall of Fame.

Early life 
Calloway was born in Rochester, New York, on December 25, 1907 to an African American family. His mother, Martha Eulalia Reed, was a Morgan State College graduate, teacher, and church organist. His father, Cabell Calloway Jr., graduated from Lincoln University of Pennsylvania in 1898, and worked as a lawyer and in real estate. The family moved to Baltimore, Maryland, when Calloway was 11. Soon after, his father died and his mother remarried to John Nelson Fortune.

Calloway grew up in the West Baltimore neighborhood of Druid Hill. He often skipped school to earn money by selling newspapers, shining shoes, and cooling down horses at the Pimlico racetrack where he developed an interest in racing and betting on horse races. After he was caught playing dice on the church steps, his mother sent him to Downingtown Industrial and Agricultural School in 1921, a reform school run by his mother's uncle in Chester County, Pennsylvania.

Calloway resumed hustling when he returned to Baltimore and worked as a caterer while he improved his studies in school. He began private vocal lessons in 1922, and studied music throughout his formal schooling. Despite his parents' and teachers' disapproval of jazz, he began performing in nightclubs in Baltimore. His mentors included drummer Chick Webb and pianist Johnny Jones. Calloway joined his high school basketball team, and in his senior year he started playing professional basketball with the Baltimore Athenians, a team in the Negro Professional Basketball League. He graduated from Frederick Douglass High School in 1925.

Music career

1927–1929: Early career 
In 1927, Calloway joined his older sister, Blanche Calloway, on tour for the popular black musical revue Plantation Days. His sister became an accomplished bandleader before him, and he often credited her as his inspiration for entering show business. Calloway's mother wanted him to be a lawyer like his father, so once the tour ended he enrolled at Crane College in Chicago, but he was more interested in singing and entertaining. While at Crane he refused the opportunity to play basketball for the Harlem Globetrotters to pursue a singing career.

Calloway spent most of his nights at Chicago's Dreamland Café, Sunset Cafe, and Club Berlin, performing as a singer, drummer, and master of ceremonies. At Sunset Cafe, he was an understudy for singer Adelaide Hall. There he met and performed with Louis Armstrong, who taught him to sing in the scat style. He left school to sing with the Alabamians band.

In 1929, Calloway relocated to New York with the band. They opened at the Savoy Ballroom on September 20, 1929. When the Alabamians broke up, Armstrong recommended Calloway as a replacement singer in the musical revue Connie's Hot Chocolates. He established himself as a vocalist singing "Ain't Misbehavin'" by Fats Waller. While Calloway was performing in the revue, the Missourians asked him to front their band.

1930–1955: Success 
In 1930, the Missourians became known as Cab Calloway and His Orchestra. At the Cotton Club in Harlem, New York, the band was hired in 1931 to substitute for the Duke Ellington Orchestra while Ellington's band was on tour. Their popularity led to a permanent position. The band also performed twice a week for radio broadcasts on NBC. Calloway appeared on radio programs with Walter Winchell and Bing Crosby and was the first African American to have a nationally syndicated radio show. During the depths of the Great Depression, Calloway was earning $50,000 a year at 23 years old.In 1931, Calloway recorded his most famous song, "Minnie the Moocher." It was the first single record by an African American to sell a million copies. Calloway performed the song and two others, "St. James Infirmary Blues" and "The Old Man of the Mountain," in the Betty Boop cartoons Minnie the Moocher (1932), Snow-White (1933), and The Old Man of the Mountain (1933). Calloway performed voice-over for these cartoons, and through rotoscoping, his dance steps were the basis of the characters' movements.

As a result of the success of "Minnie the Moocher", Calloway became identified with its chorus, gaining the nickname "The Hi De Ho Man". The Song “Minnie The Moocher” by Cab Calloway actually had lyrics that were unsung in most versions of the song. There is not a single recording of Cab Calloway singing these lyrics that is known. He performed in the 1930s in a series of short films for Paramount. Calloway's and Ellington's groups were featured on film more than any other jazz orchestras of the era. In these films, Calloway can be seen performing a gliding backstep dance move, which some observers have described as the precursor to Michael Jackson's moonwalk. Calloway said 50 years later, "it was called The Buzz back then." The 1933 film International House featured Calloway performing his classic song, "Reefer Man", a tune about a man who smokes marijuana. Fredi Washington was cast as Calloway's love interest in Cab Calloway's Hi-De-Ho (1934). Lena Horne made her film debut as a dancer in Cab Calloway's Jitterbug Party (1935).

Calloway made his first Hollywood feature film appearance opposite Al Jolson in The Singing Kid (1936). He sang several duets with Jolson, and the film included Calloway's band and 22 Cotton Club dancers from New York. According to film critic Arthur Knight, the creators of the film intended to "erase and celebrate boundaries and differences, including most emphatically the color line...when Calloway begins singing in his characteristic style – in which the words are tools for exploring rhythm and stretching melody – it becomes clear that American culture is changing around Jolson and with (and through) Calloway".

Calloway's band recorded for Brunswick and the ARC dime-store labels (Banner, Cameo, Conqueror, Perfect, Melotone, Banner, Oriole) from 1930 to 1932, when he signed with RCA Victor for a year. He returned to Brunswick in late 1934 through 1936, then moved to Variety, run by his manager, Irving Mills. He remained with Mills when the label collapsed during the Depression. Their sessions were continued by Vocalion through 1939 and OKeh through 1942. After an AFM recording ban due to the 1942–44 musicians' strike, Calloway continued to record.

In 1938, Calloway released Cab Calloway's Cat-ologue: A "Hepster's" Dictionary, the first dictionary published by an African American. It became the official jive language reference book of the New York Public Library. A revised version of the book was released with Professor Cab Calloway's Swingformation Bureau in 1939. He released the last edition, The New Cab Calloway's Hepsters Dictionary: Language of Jive, in 1944. On a BBC Radio documentary about the dictionary in 2014, Poet Lemn Sissay stated, "Cab Calloway was taking ownership of language for a people who, just a few generations before, had their own languages taken away."

Calloway's band in the 1930s and 1940s included many notable musicians, such as Ben Webster, Illinois Jacquet, Milt Hinton, Danny Barker, Doc Cheatham, Ed Swayze, Cozy Cole, Eddie Barefield, and Dizzy Gillespie. Calloway later recalled, "What I expected from my musicians was what I was selling: the right notes with precision, because I would build a whole song around a scat or dance step." Calloway and his band formed baseball and basketball teams. They played each other while on the road, play against local semi-pro teams, and play charity games. His renown as a talented musician was such that, in the opening scene of the 1940 musical film Strike Up the Band, starring Mickey Rooney and Judy Garland, Rooney's character is admonished by his music teacher, "You are not Cab Calloway," after playing an improvised drum riff in the middle of a band lesson.

In 1941, Calloway fired Gillespie from his orchestra after an onstage fracas erupted when Calloway was hit with spitballs. He wrongly accused Gillespie, who stabbed Calloway in the leg with a small knife.

From 1941 to 1942, Calloway hosted a weekly radio quiz show called The Cab Calloway Quizzicale. Calling himself "Doctor" Calloway, it was a parody of The College of Musical Knowledge, a radio contest created by bandleader Kay Kyser. During the years of World War II, Calloway entertained troops in United States before they departed overseas. The Calloway Orchestra also recorded songs full of social commentary including "Doing the Reactionary," "The Führer's Got the Jitters," "The Great Lie," "We'll Gather Lilacs," and "My Lament for V Day."

In 1943, Calloway appeared in the film Stormy Weather, one of the first mainstream Hollywood films with a black cast. The film featured other top performers of the time, including Bill "Bojangles" Robinson, Lena Horne, the Nicholas Brothers, and Fats Waller. Calloway would host Horne's character Selina Rogers as she performed the film's title song as part of a big all-star revue for World War II soldiers.

Calloway wrote a humorous pseudo-gossip column called "Coastin' with Cab" for Song Hits magazine. It was a collection of celebrity snippets, such as the following in the May 1946 issue: "Benny Goodman was dining at Ciro's steak house in New York when a very homely girl entered. 'If her face is her fortune,' Benny quipped, 'she'd be tax-free.'" In the late 1940s, however, Calloway's bad financial decisions and his gambling caused his band to break up.

In 1953, he played the prominent role of Sportin' Life in a production of Porgy and Bess with William Warfield and Leontyne Price as the title characters.

1956–1960: Cotton Club Revue 
Calloway and his daughter Lael recorded "Little Child", an adaption of "Little Boy and the Old Man". Released on ABC-Paramount, the single charted on the Billboard Hot 100 in 1956.

In 1956, Clarence Robinson, who produced revues at the original Cotton Club and the Apollo Theater, and choreographed the movie Stormy Weather, cast Calloway as the main attraction for his project in Miami. The Cotton Club of Miami featured a troupe of 48 people, including singer Sallie Blair, George Kirby, Abbey Lincoln, and the dance troupe of Norma Miller. The success of the shows led to the Cotton Club Revue of 1957 which had stops at the Royal Nevada Hotel in Las Vegas, the Theatre Under The Sky in Central Park, Town Casino in Buffalo.

For the second season, Lee Sherman was the choreographer of The Cotton Club Revue of 1958, which starred Calloway. The revue featured tap dancing prodigies Maurice Hines and Gregory Hines.

In March 1958, Calloway released his album Cotton Club Revue of 1958 on Gone Records. It was produced by George Goldner, conducted and arranged by Eddie Barefield. That year, Calloway appeared in the film St. Louis Blues, the life story of W.C. Handy, featuring Nat King Cole and Eartha Kitt.

The Cotton Club Revue of 1959 traveled to South America for engagements in Rio de Janeiro and São Paulo. They also stopped in Uruguay and Argentina before returning to North America which included a run on Broadway. Directed by Mervyn Nelson and choreographed by Joel Nobel, this edition featured Ketty Lester, The Three Chocolateers. The revue toured Europe in 1959 and 1960, bringing their act to Madrid, Paris, and London.

1961–1993: Later years 
Calloway remained a household name due to TV appearances and occasional concerts in the US and Europe. In 1961 and 1962, he toured with the Harlem Globetrotters, providing halftime entertainment during games.

Calloway was cast as "Yeller" in the film The Cincinnati Kid (1965) with Steve McQueen, Ann-Margret, and Edward G. Robinson. Calloway appeared on The Ed Sullivan Show on March 19, 1967, with his daughter Chris Calloway. In 1967, he co-starred with Pearl Bailey as Horace Vandergelder in an all-black cast of Hello, Dolly! on Broadway during its original run. Chris Calloway also joined the cast as Minnie Fay. The new cast revived the flagging business for the show and RCA Victor released a new cast recording, rare for the time. In 1973–74, Calloway was featured in an unsuccessful Broadway revival of The Pajama Game with Hal Linden and Barbara McNair.

His autobiography, Of Minnie the Moocher and Me was published in 1976. It included his complete Hepster's Dictionary as an appendix. In 1978, Calloway released a disco version of "Minnie the Moocher" on RCA which reached the Billboard R&B chart. Calloway was introduced to a new generation when he appeared in the 1980 film The Blues Brothers performing "Minnie the Moocher".

In 1985, Calloway and his Orchestra appeared at The Ritz London Hotel where he was filmed for a 60-minute BBC TV show called The Cotton Club Comes to the Ritz. Adelaide Hall, Doc Cheatham, Max Roach, and the Nicholas Brothers also appeared on the bill. A performance with the Cincinnati Pops Orchestra directed by Erich Kunzel in August 1988 was recorded on video and features a classic presentation of "Minnie the Moocher", 57 years after he first recorded it.

In January 1990, Calloway performed at the Meyerhoff Symphony Hall, with the Baltimore Symphony. That year he made a cameo in Janet Jackson's music video "Alright". He continued to perform at Jazz festivals, including the New Orleans Jazz & Heritage Festival and Greenwood Jazz. In 1992, he embarked on a month-long tour of European jazz festivals. He was booked to headline "The Jazz Connection: The Jewish and African-American Relationship," at New York City's Avery Fisher Hall in 1993, but he pulled out due to a fall at home.

Personal life

Marriages and children 
In January 1927, Calloway had a daughter named Camay with Zelma Proctor, a fellow student. His daughter was one of the first African-Americans to teach in a white school in Virginia. Calloway married his first wife Wenonah "Betty" Conacher in July 1928. They adopted a daughter named Constance and  divorced in 1949. Calloway married Zulme "Nuffie" MacNeal on October 7, 1949. They lived in Long Beach on the South Shore of Long Island, New York, on the border with neighboring Lido Beach. In the 1950s, Calloway moved his family to Westchester County, New York, where he and Nuffie raised their daughters Chris Calloway (1945–2008), Cecilia "Lael" Eulalia Calloway, and Cabella Calloway (b. 1952).

Legal issues 
In December 1945, Calloway and his friend Felix H. Payne Jr. were beaten by a police officer, William E. Todd, and arrested in Kansas City, Missouri after attempting to visit bandleader Lionel Hampton at the whites-only Pla-Mor Ballroom. They were taken to the hospital for injuries, then charged with intoxication and resisting arrest. When Hampton learned of the incident he refused to continue the concert. Todd said he was informed by the manager, who did not recognize Calloway, that they were attempting to enter. He claimed they refused to leave and struck him. Calloway and Payne denied his claims and maintained they had been sober; the charges were dismissed. In February 1946, six civil rights organizations, including the NAACP, demanded that Todd be fired, but he had already resigned after a pay cut.

In 1952, Calloway was arrested in Leesburg, Virginia on his way to the race track in Charles Town, West Virginia. He was charged with speeding and attempted bribery of a policeman.

Death 
On June 12, 1994, Calloway suffered a stroke at his home in Westchester County, New York. He died five months later from pneumonia on November 18, 1994, a month before his 87th birthday, at a nursing home in Hockessin, Delaware. He was survived by his wife, five daughters, and seven grandsons. Calloway was buried at Ferncliff Cemetery in Hartsdale, New York.

Legacy 
Music critics have written of his influence on later generations of entertainers such as James Brown, Michael Jackson, Janet Jackson, as well as modern-day hip-hop performers. John Landis, who directed Calloway in the 1980 film The Blues Brothers, stated, "Cab Calloway is hip-hop." Journalist Timothy White noted in Billboard (August 14, 1993): "No living pathfinder in American popular music or its jazz and rock 'n' roll capillaries is so frequently emulated yet so seldom acknowledged as Cabell "Cab" Calloway. He arguably did more things first and better than any other band leader of his generation."

In 1998, the Cab Calloway Orchestra directed by Calloway's grandson Chris "CB" Calloway Brooks was formed. In 2009, Big Bad Voodoo Daddy released an album covering Calloway's music titled How Big Can You Get?: The Music of Cab Calloway. In 2012, Calloway's legacy was celebrated in an episode of PBS's American Masters titled "Cab Calloway: Sketches".

In 2019, plans were announced to demolish Calloway's boyhood home at 2216 Druid Hill Avenue in Baltimore, replacing the abandoned structure and the rest of that block with a park to be named Cab Calloway Legends Park in his honor. Family members and the National Trust for Historic Preservation advocated preservation of the house, however, as a significant artifact of African-American cultural heritage. Although the block is designated "historically significant" on the National Register of Historic Places, Baltimore City officials said at a hearing on July 9, 2019, that there is "extensive structural damage" to the Calloway house as well as adjacent ones. The Commission on Historical and Architectural Preservation's executive director, however, said that properties in worse condition than the Calloway House have been restored with financial support from a city tax credit program. Maryland Governor Larry Hogan also urged that demolition of the Calloway House be forestalled for its potential preservation as a historic house museum akin to the Louis Armstrong House in New York. Design options for the planned Cab Calloway Square may include an archway from the facade (pictured) as part of the Square's entrance, as proposed by architects working with Baltimore City and the Druid Heights Community Development Corporation, a Non-Profit community oriented group. Despite objections, the house was razed on September 5, 2020.

In 2022, his home films were selected for preservation in the United States National Film Registry by the Library of Congress as being "culturally, historically, or aesthetically significant".

Awards and honors 
In 1985, Town Supervisor Anthony F. Veteran issued a proclamation, declaring a ''Cab Calloway Day'' in Greenburgh, New York.

In 1990, Calloway was presented with the Beacons in Jazz Award from The New School in New York City. New York City Mayor David Dinkins proclaimed the day "Cab Calloway Day".

In 1992, the Cab Calloway School of the Arts was founded in Wilmington, Delaware.

In 1994, Calloway's daughter Camay Calloway Murphy founded the Cab Calloway Museum at Coppin State College in Baltimore, Maryland.

The New York Racing Association (NYRA) annually honors the jazz legend, a native of Rochester, N.Y., with a stakes races restricted to NY-bred three-year-olds, as part of their New York Stallion Series. First run in 2003, The Calloway has since undergone various distance and surface changes. The race is currently run at Saratoga Racecourse, Saratoga Springs, NY, one of America's most popular, premier racetracks. The Cab Calloway Stakes celebrated its 13th renewal on July 24, 2019, and was won by Rinaldi. In 2020 Calloway was inducted into the National Rhythm & Blues Hall of Fame

Calloway received the following accolades:

 1967: Best Performance, Outer Critics Circle Awards (Hello, Dolly)
 1987: Inducted into Big Band and Jazz Hall of Fame
1990: Beacons in Jazz Award, The New School
 1993: National Medal of Arts
 1993: Honorary Doctorate of Fine Arts, University of Rochester
 1993: Cab Calloway School of the Arts dedicated in his name in Wilmington, Delaware
1995: Inducted into International Jazz Hall of Fame
 1999: Grammy Hall of Fame Award for "Minnie the Moocher"
 2008: Grammy Lifetime Achievement Award
 2018: "Minnie the Moocher" added to the Library of Congress National Recording Registry

Discography

Albums 

 1943: Cab Calloway And His Orchestra (Brunswick)
 1956: Cab Calloway (Epic)
 1958: Cotton Club Revue 1958 (Gone Records)
 1959: Hi De Hi De Ho (RCA Victor)
 1962: Blues Makes Me Happy (Coral)
 1968: Cab Calloway '68 (Pickwick International)

Select compilations 

 1974: Hi De Ho Man (Columbia)
 1983: Mr. Hi. De. Ho. 1930–1931 (MCA)
 1990: Cab Calloway: Best Of The Big Bands (Columbia)
 1992: The King Of Hi-De-Ho 1934–1947 (Giants of Jazz)
 1998: Jumpin' Jive (Camden)
 2001: Cab Calloway and His Orchestra Volume 1: The Early Years 1930–1934 (JSP)
 2003: Cab Calloway & His Orchestra Volume 2: 1935–1940 (JSP)

Charting singles

Stage

Filmography 

Features
 The Big Broadcast (1932) – Himself
 International House (1933) – Cab Calloway
 The Singing Kid (1936) – Cotton Club Band Leader
 Manhattan Merry-Go-Round (1937) – Cotton Club Orchestra Leader (uncredited)
 Stormy Weather (1943) – Himself
 Sensations of 1945 (1944) – Himself
 Ebony Parade (1947) – Himself (archive footage)
 Hi De Ho (1947) – Cab Calloway
 Rhythm and Blues Revue (1955)
 Basin Street Revue (1956) – Himself
 St. Louis Blues (1958) – Blade
 Schlager-Raketen (1960) – Sänger / Himself
 The Cincinnati Kid (1965) – Yeller
 The Littlest Angel (1969) – Gabriel
 The Blues Brothers (1980) – Curtis

Short subjects
 Minnie the Moocher (1932) – Himself – Bandleader (uncredited)
 Snow-White (1933) – Koko the Clown (voice, uncredited)
 The Old Man of the Mountain (1933) – Cab Calloway & Old Man
 Betty Boop's Rise to Fame (1934) – Old Man (voice, uncredited)
 Cab Calloway's Hi-De-Ho (1934) – Himself
 Cab Calloway's Jitterbug Party (1935) – Himself
 Hi De Ho (1937) – Himself
 Mother Goose Goes Hollywood (1938)
 Meet the Maestros (1938) – Band Leader, ZaZuZaz number
 Alright by Janet Jackson (1990) – Himself

References

Further reading 
 Calloway, Cab and Rollins, Bryant (1976). Of Minnie the Moocher and Me. Thomas Y. Crowell Company.

External links 
 Cab Calloway School of the Arts official website
 NAMM Oral History Interview (1993)
 

1907 births
1994 deaths
Jazz musicians from Maryland
Jazz musicians from New York (state)
Singers from Maryland
Musicians from Baltimore
Musicians from New York City
Musicians from Rochester, New York
People from New Castle County, Delaware
Songwriters from Maryland
Songwriters from New York (state)
Lincoln University (Pennsylvania) alumni
20th-century American dancers
American blues singers
African-American jazz musicians
African-American male dancers
American jazz bandleaders
American jazz singers
American male dancers
Articles containing video clips
Big band bandleaders
Burials at Ferncliff Cemetery
Converts to Anglicanism from Presbyterianism
Grammy Lifetime Achievement Award winners
United States National Medal of Arts recipients
The Cab Calloway Orchestra members
Jive singers
Scat singers
Swing bandleaders
Swing singers
Vaudeville performers
ABC Records artists
Vocalion Records artists
Brunswick Records artists
Columbia Records artists
Bell Records artists
Okeh Records artists
RCA Victor artists
RCA Records artists
Coral Records artists
Epic Records artists
American stage actors
Nightclub performers
20th-century African-American male singers
African-American songwriters
Deaths from pneumonia in Delaware
African-American history of Westchester County, New York